
This is a list of bridges documented by the Historic American Engineering Record in the U.S. state of Arkansas.

Bridges

Notes

References

List
List
Arkansas
Bridges, HAER
Bridges, HAER